Frank Mavius (born 15 March 1956) is a retired East German weightlifter who won four medals in the bantamweight category (56 kg) at the European championships of 1977–1985. He was also placed third in individual events at the 1977 and 1982 World championships.

Mavius took up weightlifting in 1971 and around then moved from Görlitz to Dresden, where he had better training conditions. He is married to Ursel, a nurse, and has two daughters, Linda and Vilma.

References

1956 births
Living people
German male weightlifters
East German sportsmen
European Weightlifting Championships medalists
People from Görlitz
Sportspeople from Saxony